In criminal law, self-incrimination is the act of exposing oneself generally, by making a statement, "to an accusation or charge of crime; to involve oneself or another [person] in a criminal prosecution or the danger thereof". (Self-incrimination can occur either directly or indirectly: directly, by means of interrogation where information of a self-incriminatory nature is disclosed; or indirectly, when information of a self-incriminatory nature is disclosed voluntarily without pressure from another person).

In many legal systems, accused criminals cannot be compelled to incriminate themselves—they may choose to speak to police or other authorities, but they cannot be punished for refusing to do so. There are 108 countries and jurisdictions that currently issue legal warnings to suspects, which include the right to remain silent and the right to legal counsel. These laws are not uniform across the world; however, members of the European Union have developed their laws around the EU's guide.

Canadian law
In Canada, similar rights exist pursuant to the Charter of Rights and Freedoms. Section 11 of the Charter provides that one cannot be compelled to be a witness in a proceeding against oneself. Section 11(c) states:

An important caveat in Canadian law is that this does not apply to a person who is not charged in the case in question. A person issued a subpoena, who is not charged in respect of the offence being considered, must give testimony. However, this testimony cannot later be used against the person in another case. Section 13 of the Charter states:

Historically, in Canadian common law, witnesses could refuse to give testimony that would self-incriminate. However, section 5(1) of the Canada Evidence Act eliminated that absolute common law privilege by instead compelling witnesses to testify. In exchange, section 5(2) of the same act granted the witnesses immunity from having that evidence used against them in the future except in the case of perjury or impeachment. While these provisions of the Canada Evidence Act are still operational, they have been overtaken in their application by the immunities granted by sections 13 and 7 of the Canadian Charter of Rights and Freedoms.

Chinese law 

After the 1996 amendments to the Criminal Procedure Law, Article 15 states that "It shall be strictly prohibited to extort confessions by torture, gather evidence by threat, enticement, deceit, or other illegal means, or force anyone to commit self-incrimination." In 2012 the law was also re-amended to strengthen the human rights protection of criminal suspects. China has since recognized the right against self-incrimination and forced confessions are prohibited by law. However, in practice as human rights violations in China continue to be committed, it is still common practice for police to use torture on suspects to obtain forced confessions. China's accession to the United Nations's International Covenant on Civil and Political Rights in 1998 also guarantees Chinese citizens the right against self-incrimination; however, China has not ratified the treaty.

Indian law

In India, under Article 20 (3) of the Constitution, the defendant has the right against self-incrimination, but witnesses are not given the same right.

A defendant must be informed of their rights before making any statements that may incriminate them. Defendants must not be compelled to give any statements. In the case that a defendant is pressured into giving a statement that is self-incriminating, the statement will not be admissible in a court of law. The Code of Criminal Procedure and the Indian Constitution give defendants the Right to Silence, i.e. the right to withhold self-incriminating information to authorities. The defendant must inform the authorities that he or she is exercising their Right to Silence; withholding information is not considered using their right to withhold information that can potentially be self-incriminating. In order to exercise their right to remain silent, the defendant must verbally and clearly state that they are doing so. For example, a defendant can say, "I am exercising my right to remain silent and will not be answering any further questions." Article 20 (3) does not pertain to those who made a confession willingly without being intimidated or coerced into making such statement.

English and Welsh law

The right against self-incrimination originated in England and Wales. In countries deriving their laws as an extension of the history of English Common Law, a body of law has grown around the concept of providing individuals with the means to protect themselves from self-incrimination.

Applying to England and Wales, the Criminal Justice and Public Order Act 1994 amended the right to silence by allowing inferences to be drawn by the jury in cases where a suspect refuses to explain something, and then later produces an explanation. In other words, the jury is entitled to infer that the accused fabricated the explanation at a later date, as he or she refused to provide the explanation during the time of the police questioning. The jury is also free not to make such an inference.

Scots law
In Scots criminal and civil law, both common and statute law originated and operate separately from that in England and Wales. In Scots law, the right to silence remains unchanged by the above, and juries' rights to draw inferences are severely curtailed.

On January 25, 2018, the law in Scotland changed in regards to people being detained by police. These changes only affect people who are arrested after January 25, 2018. Those who are arrested have 'the right to remain silent' and are not obligated to answer questions asked by police. However, although someone being detained by police does not need to answer questions regarding the crime they are accused of, it is mandatory for detainees to answer basic questions of identity such as: name, date of birth, address, and nationality.

United States law
The Fifth Amendment to the United States Constitution protects the accused from being forced to incriminate themselves in a crime. The Amendment reads:

No person ... shall be compelled in any criminal case to be a witness against himself ...

Additionally, under the Miranda ruling, a person also has the right to remain silent while in police custody so as to not reveal any incriminating information. In order to invoke this constitutional right to remain silent, a person must explicitly and unambiguously tell officers that they are exercising this right to remain silent. Therefore, staying silent without a prior exclamation that you are exercising this constitutional right does not invoke the right.

In Miranda v. Arizona (1966) the United States Supreme Court ruled that the Fifth Amendment privilege against self-incrimination requires law enforcement officials to advise a suspect interrogated in custody of them their right to remain silent and their right to an attorney. Justice Robert H. Jackson further notes that "any lawyer worth his salt will tell the suspect in no uncertain terms to make no statement to police under any circumstances".

Miranda warnings must be given before there is any "questioning initiated by law enforcement officers after a person has been taken into custody or otherwise deprived of his freedom of action in any significant way". Suspects must be warned, prior to the interrogation, that they have the right to remain silent, that anything they say may be used against them in a court of law, that they have the right to have an attorney and if one cannot afford an attorney, one will be appointed to defend such person. Further, only after such warnings are given and understood, may the individual knowingly waive them and agree to answer questions or make a statement.

It is also important to note that the Fifth Amendment protects certain types of evidence, specifically testimonial evidence, which are statements that are spoken by the person in question that are made under oath. For a list of other different types of evidence, see Evidence (law).

Shift in court decision regarding handcuff usage 

The United States Supreme Court rulings of Miranda v. Arizona and Terry v. Ohio leave questions about the types of conduct that are appropriate for both the protection of the public, and criminal suspects' constitutional rights. The use of handcuffs on a suspect during a Terry stop infringes on their Fourth and Fifth Amendment rights. During the action of handcuffing a suspect, a custodial environment is created, thereby invoking the information of that individual's Miranda rights. The Second Circuit Court maintained the notion that by utilizing handcuffs during a Terry stop, that stop is then automatically transformed into an arrest, thus warranting the reading of Miranda rights, up until the decision of US versus Fiseku.

In holdings of U.S. versus Fiseku, the defendant argues that the officers’ use of handcuffs convert a Terry stop into an arrest without probable cause, thus violating his Fourth Amendment rights. The District Court ruled in disagreement with this matter, suggesting that there were unusual circumstances surrounding the investigatory stop, requiring the use of handcuffs in order to ensure the protection of those officers involved. This differs from Second Circuit court rulings of the past.

In the case of U.S. vs. Newton, a police officer is permitted to utilize handcuffs during a Terry stop if he or she has reason to believe that the detainee poses an immediate physical threat, and that by handcuffing the individual, the potential threat is defused in the least invasive means possible.

In the case of U.S. vs. Bailey, the Second Circuit court found the officers' original stop to be constitutional, but ruled that the events which transpired after handcuffing took place fell outside the realm of a constitutional Terry stop. This results from both suspects having already been patted down and deemed unarmed. At which point, the officers had no authority to handcuff either of these men, as they were already proven to be non-threatening.

In both cases, the Second Circuit court made the determination that the use of handcuffs converted these stops into arrests, and were grounds for Miranda. The ruling of U.S. versus Fiseku disrupts this conversion trend by determining otherwise. The grounds for this holding are ambiguous, given the striking similarities between this court ruling and those of Newton and Bailey. The new verdict could potentially be instituted to enable police officials to impede on citizens' constitutional rights as long as the technique being used is considered to be less intrusive than that of an officer pulling his or her gun on an unarmed suspect.

Truthful statements by an innocent person

An incriminating statement includes any statement that tends to increase the danger that the person making the statement will be accused, charged or prosecuted – even if the statement is true, and even if the person is innocent of any crime. Thus, even a person who is innocent of any crime who testifies truthfully can be incriminated by that testimony. The United States Supreme Court has stated that the Fifth Amendment privilege

The U.S. Supreme Court has also stated:

See also
Privilege (evidence)
Right to silence

References

Further reading

Evidence law
Criminal procedure
Legal communication
Criminal law

de:Nemo tenetur se ipsum accusare